The Kansas, Oklahoma and Gulf Railway  (KO&G) was formed on July 31, 1919 from the assets of the bankrupt Missouri, Oklahoma and Gulf Railway.  The KO&G largely consisted of a single line from Baxter Springs, Kansas, to Denison, Texas, prior to its purchase by Missouri Pacific's Texas and Pacific Railway in 1964 and merger in 1970.

The KO&G owed much of its latter existence to its status as a bridge line between the Missouri Pacific at Okay, Oklahoma and the Missouri Pacific-controlled Texas and Pacific Railway at Denison, Texas.  This traffic was the main source of revenue for the KO&G and was the primary reason that the MP acquired it.

The KO&G came under common control of the Muskogee Company (often referred to as the "Muskogee Roads" or the "Muskogee Lines") in 1925, sharing common management with the Midland Valley Railroad and the Oklahoma City-Ada-Atoka Railway from 1930 to 1964.

In 1967 KO&G operated 209 miles of railroad and reported 457 million ton-miles of revenue freight.

References

Stagner, Lloyd E. Midland Valley: Rails For Coal, Cattle, & Crude. David City, Nebraska: South Platte Press, 1996. 

Defunct Kansas railroads
Defunct Oklahoma railroads
Defunct Texas railroads
Former Class I railroads in the United States
Predecessors of the Missouri Pacific Railroad
Railway companies established in 1919
Railway companies disestablished in 1970
American companies established in 1919
American companies disestablished in 1970